Dexamenus (Ancient Greek: Δεξάμενος means "hospitable") was a name attributed to at least three characters in Greek mythology.

Dexamenus, son of Oeceus, and a king of Olenus. The Centaur Eurytion forced him to betroth his daughter, Mnesimache, to him. Heracles rescued the girl, killing Eurytion when he showed up to claim his bride. In another version of the tale, the girl was instead Deianira, Heracles' future wife (elsewhere said to be a daughter of Oeneus or Dionysus and Althaea). Heracles violated her and promised her father that he would marry her. After his departure, Eurytion appeared, demanding Deianira as his bride. Her father, afraid, gave in, but Heracles reappeared just in time and slew the Centaur. In yet another variant, the daughter's name is Hippolyte and Eurytion threatens violence to her at her wedding feast (she having married Azan); Heracles, who is also attending the feast, kills him. Dexamenus' other children include Eurypylus and the twins Theronice and Theraephone, both also married another set of twins, the Molionides.
Dexamenus, son of Heracles and father of Ambrax, king of Ambracia (a city in Epirus).
Dexamenus, son of Mesolus and Ambracia, the daughter of Phorbas. After him a part of the region Ambracia was called Dexamenae.

Notes

References 

 Apollodorus, The Library with an English Translation by Sir James George Frazer, F.B.A., F.R.S. in 2 Volumes, Cambridge, MA, Harvard University Press; London, William Heinemann Ltd. 1921. ISBN 0-674-99135-4. Online version at the Perseus Digital Library. Greek text available from the same website.
Diodorus Siculus, The Library of History translated by Charles Henry Oldfather. Twelve volumes. Loeb Classical Library. Cambridge, Massachusetts: Harvard University Press; London: William Heinemann, Ltd. 1989. Vol. 3. Books 4.59–8. Online version at Bill Thayer's Web Site
 Diodorus Siculus, Bibliotheca Historica. Vol 1-2. Immanel Bekker. Ludwig Dindorf. Friedrich Vogel. in aedibus B. G. Teubneri. Leipzig. 1888–1890. Greek text available at the Perseus Digital Library.
 Dionysus of Halicarnassus, Roman Antiquities. English translation by Earnest Cary in the Loeb Classical Library, 7 volumes. Harvard University Press, 1937–1950. Online version at Bill Thayer's Web Site
 Dionysius of Halicarnassus, Antiquitatum Romanarum quae supersunt, Vol I-IV. . Karl Jacoby. In Aedibus B.G. Teubneri. Leipzig. 1885. Greek text available at the Perseus Digital Library.
 Gaius Julius Hyginus, Fabulae from The Myths of Hyginus translated and edited by Mary Grant. University of Kansas Publications in Humanistic Studies. Online version at the Topos Text Project.
Hard, Robin, The Routledge Handbook of Greek Mythology: Based on H.J. Rose's "Handbook of Greek Mythology", Psychology Press, 2004, . Google Books.
 Pausanias, Description of Greece with an English Translation by W.H.S. Jones, Litt.D., and H.A. Ormerod, M.A., in 4 Volumes. Cambridge, MA, Harvard University Press; London, William Heinemann Ltd. 1918. . Online version at the Perseus Digital Library
Pausanias, Graeciae Descriptio. 3 vols. Leipzig, Teubner. 1903.  Greek text available at the Perseus Digital Library.
 Stephanus of Byzantium, Stephani Byzantii Ethnicorum quae supersunt, edited by August Meineike (1790-1870), published 1849. A few entries from this important ancient handbook of place names have been translated by Brady Kiesling. Online version at the Topos Text Project.

Children of Heracles
Kings in Greek mythology
Aetolian characters in Greek mythology
Mythology of Heracles

de:Dexamenos
sk:Dexamenos